D12 (an initialism for The Dirty Dozen) is an American hip hop collective and former supergroup from Detroit, Michigan. Formed in 1996, the group achieved mainstream success with its lineup of de facto leader Eminem, Proof, Bizarre, Mr. Porter, Kuniva and Swifty McVay.

D12 had chart-topping albums in the United States, United Kingdom, and Australia during the early 2000s. The group released the albums Devil's Night in 2001 and D12 World in 2004, spawning numerous hits such as "Fight Music", "Purple Pills", "My Band", "How Come" and "Shit on You" throughout that period. Both albums were certified double platinum by the Recording Industry Association of America (RIAA). In 2004, the group won the MTV Europe Music Award for Best Hip-Hop Act.

Since 2006, Eminem's hiatus and the death of Proof resulted in the group being less active in subsequent years. Between 2008 and 2015, D12 released three official mixtapes with the core lineup reduced to Bizarre, Kuniva and Swifty, with isolated token appearances by Eminem and some contributions from Mr. Porter and Fuzz Scoota. Mr. Porter left the group in 2012 and later rejoined, but his contributions during this period were minor as he concentrated on his solo career as a producer. 

On August 31, 2018, Eminem released his tenth studio album Kamikaze (2018), containing a song titled "Stepping Stone", announcing that D12 had officially disbanded. However, as Bizarre, Kuniva and Swifty had been recording and touring under the name D12 as a trio for several years prior to Eminem's announcement and have continued to do so since, this announcement is more accurately read as Eminem's official retirement from the group after a decade of token involvement.

History

Early career and The Underground EP (1996–1998)
D12 was initially formed in 1991 by Proof who invited local Detroit rappers such as Bizarre, Eminem and other members who would leave the crew before it achieved success including Eye Kyu, Killa Hawk and Fuzz. The group was a loose collective in the vein of Wu-Tang Clan. Several members began making names for themselves in hip hop during the late 1990s. 

In 1997, they released their debut extended play, The Underground EP, which was recorded between 1996 and 1997. In 1997 and 1998, its members began establishing reputations locally. Bizarre was named Inner City Entertainment'''s "Flava of the Week" and went on to release an album, Attack of the Weirdos. Along with Eminem, Rah Digga and Young Zee, he became an honorary member of The Outsidaz. Proof won a freestyling competition run by The Source. In 1999, Bugz released These Streets EP, and made several appearances on other rappers' songs.

Around the time of Eminem's first record deal, Proof attempted to revive D12. He managed to recruit local Detroit hip hop duo Da Brigade, composed of Kuniva, a local MC, and Mr. Porter, a longtime friend of Eminem and Proof. At the time, Porter was the group's producer (he later produced Eminem's first album, Infinite), but Kuniva persuaded him to join the group as an artist. Later the group was joined by Bugz, and Bugz introduced his longtime friend Swift, who at the time was a member of rap duo Da Rabeez.

Death of Bugz (1999)
On May 21, 1999, Bugz was shot and killed at a picnic. One of his final acts had been a request that Swift join the group. Eminem volunteered to replace Bugz; this led to him rejoining the group.Mr. Obnoxious, his first solo album, was released in February 2000 after his death. D12's first album, Devil's Night, is dedicated to him.

Devil's Night, D12 World and appearances without Eminem (2000–2005)
Their debut album, Devil's Night, referring to the tradition of setting unoccupied buildings on fire the night before Halloween, was released in June 2001. It debuted at number one on the U.S. and number two on the UK chart, also reaching the top of the Canadian charts. Devil's Night went on to sell four million albums worldwide and two million in the U.S. In 2021, the album was rereleased digitally as an expanded edition to celebrate the twentieth anniversary of its release which featured three bonus tracks, an unreleased freestyle, the a cappella version of "Shit On You" and the instrumentals to "Shit On You", "Purple Pills", "Fight Music" and "Blow My Buzz".

In August 2001, D12 and Esham were kicked off the Warped Tour after members of the group physically attacked Esham over the lyrics of his song "Chemical Imbalance", which contained a reference to Eminem's daughter. Eminem was not present during the tour.D12 World was released on April 27, 2004, featuring production by Dr. Dre, Eminem, Porter and Kanye West, and guest appearances by Obie Trice on the track "Loyalty" and B-Real of Cypress Hill on the track "American Psycho II". It debuted at the top of the U.S., UK, and Australian albums charts, and at number two in Germany—selling over half a million records in its first week of release in the U.S. alone. "My Band", the album's first single, also reached number one in Australia, New Zealand and the U.S. rhythmic top forty, the top five in the UK and Germany, and the top ten on the Billboard Hot 100.

D12 was eclipsed by Eminem's success, touring without him to promote their second album while he recorded Encore. D12 members Bizarre and Proof managed mildly successful solo careers with the releases of Hannicap Circus and Searching for Jerry Garcia in 2005. D12 performed live, without Eminem, at the House of Blues in Chicago to promote both albums. That concert was released on DVD in 2005 as D12: Live in Chicago.

D12, without Eminem, performed on the track "She-Devil" of Tech N9ne's 2002 album Absolute Power. In the same year, the band, without Eminem, sang on the Gorillaz track 911, which featured Terry Hall, for the Bad Company Soundtrack. They recorded "Hit Me with Your Best Shot" for Eminem's album Recovery but the song wasn't included on the album. It was eventually included on an Eminem mixtape Straight from the Lab Part 2 in 2011.

Death of Proof and Eminem Presents: The Re-Up (2006)

On April 11, 2006, Proof "pistol-whipped an unarmed man and shot him in the head", and was in turn fatally shot by the man's cousin.

On December 5, 2006, Shady Records released Eminem Presents: The Re-Up which featured performances by Eminem, D12, 50 Cent, Obie Trice, Stat Quo, Bobby Creekwater and Cashis while affiliated artists such as Lloyd Banks, Akon and Nate Dogg, made guest appearances. Some tracks were collaborative performances from D12 members, such as "Murder" by Bizarre and Kuniva and "Whatever You Want" by Swifty McVay and Mr. Porter. The track "Trapped" by Proof included an intro by Eminem paying his final respects saying, "Big Proof, rest in peace dudey we love you. We just wanna keep making you proud."

Member changes, hiatus, mixtapes and comeback (2007–2013)
After four years of inactivity D12 released a new mixtape Return of the Dozen Vol. 1 (2008), without Eminem who was working on his solo album Relapse. There were solo performances by D12 members such as Kuniva's "If You Want It", similar to Eminem's solo performance "Girls" on Devil's Night.

The mixtape Return of the Dozen Vol. 2 (2011) followed three years later. It featured Fuzz Scoota, an original member of D12 who left in 1999. Eminem performed on one track. Because Eminem was on tour promoting Recovery with Mr. Porter his hype man D12 had only four active members, Bizarre, Kuniva, Fuzz and Swift. D12 performed at the Kanrocksas Music Festival on August 5, 2011.

The track, "Outro", off the Return of the Dozen Vol. 2 mixtape, had a music video released on September 1, 2011, though the video did not feature either Eminem or Mr. Porter. The group also stated intentions to celebrate the 10th anniversary of the release of the Devils Night album, though the celebration was held on the actual Devil's Night on October 30 in Saint Andrew's Hall in Detroit, Michigan, even though the album was released months earlier on June 19, 2001.

In 2012 Bizarre left D12, citing creative differences, and Mr. Porter left to pursue a solo career, leaving D12 with four members.

Asked about the group's status in 2012, Kuniva replied that it's "not over, we're still coming." However, when Mr. Porter was asked in 2013 about a possible new D12 album he responded "Not happening bro sorry".

Bizarre and Kon Artis rejoin, Shady XV, unreleased third studio album and The Devil's Night Mixtape (2014–2015)
In January 2014, Mark Bass of the Bass Brothers confirmed that D12 had been recently recording at the F.B.T. studio and he had been mixing their recorded material. He also confirmed that Eminem was featured on at least three songs that had been completed. In February 2014, Bizarre confirmed that he was back in the group and that D12 would be releasing their third studio album during 2014.

On August 25, 2014, a press release on Eminem's official website also revealed D12 to be featured on the label's upcoming 2-disc compilation album, titled Shady XV. The album, released on November 24, 2014, featured one greatest hits disc and one disc with new material from a variety of Shady Records recording artists including D12. The new D12 song was entitled "Bane", which features the return of Kon Artis and was also produced by him. The song did not feature Eminem or returning member Fuzz Scoota.

On August 18, 2015, D12 confirmed on Tim Westwood TV that they had already recorded a large number of songs for the album and will release it "when the time is right." On October 1, 2015, it was announced that D12 would be releasing a new mixtape, The Devil's Night Mixtape was released on October 30, 2015, and it featured Lazarus, King Gordy, Royce da 5'9", Bizarre, Swifty McVay, Kuniva and Mr. Porter. It also included a freestyle by Eminem for its introduction although he wasn't present on any other tracks throughout the whole mixtape. It was hosted by DJ Whoo Kid.

Solo careers, collaborative works, and Eminem's departure (2017–present)
In 2017, D12 had been focusing on their respective solo careers. On February 17, Swifty McVay released his debut album Grey Blood. Bizarre released his new mixtape Tweek Sity 2, in addition to working on collaborations with other artists such as Riff Raff, King Gordy and Qom Qazamah respectively. Swifty McVay and Kuniva are currently working on their collaboration album, titled My Brother's Keeper. 

On August 31, 2018, Eminem released a song titled "Stepping Stone" on his album Kamikaze. On it, Eminem announced that D12 was officially broken up due to the death of Proof. However, as Bizarre, Kuniva and Swifty had been recording and touring under the name D12 as a trio for several years prior to Eminem's announcement and have continued to do so since, this announcement is more accurately read as Eminem's official retirement from the group after a decade of mere token involvement. The group continue to tour into 2023.

Feuds
Canibus
In 2009 D12 were tricked into performing on a diss track directed at Eminem. According to D12 member Swift, rapper DZK "asked us to do a track with him when he already was teamed up with Canibus without us knowing. They dissed Em, took our verses and added them to the song so they can bring traffic and make it seem like we turning on Em..."

Members
Current members
 Bizarre (1996–2006, 2008–2012, 2014–present)
 Mr. Porter (1996–2006, 2008–2012, 2014–present)
 Kuniva (1996–2006, 2008–present)
 Swifty McVay (2000–2006, 2008–present)

Former members
 Proof (1996–2006; his death)
 Bugz (1996–1999; his death)
 Eminem (2000–2006, 2008–2018)
 Fuzz Scoota (2011–2012)

Timeline

Awards and nominations

Discography

 Devil's Night (2001)
 D12 World'' (2004)

References

External links
 
 D12World.com

Detroit hip hop groups
Eminem
Horrorcore groups
Musical groups established in 1996
Musical groups disestablished in 2018
1996 establishments in Michigan
Midwest hip hop groups
Shady Records artists
Hardcore hip hop groups
MTV Europe Music Award winners
Hip hop collectives